The Pac-12 Sixth Man Player of the Year is an annual college basketball award presented to the top bench player in men's basketball in the Pac-12 Conference.  To be eligible for Pac-12 Sixth Man of the Year, players must not exceed more than one-third starts in league games.  The winner is selected by conference coaches, who are not allowed to vote for players on their own team.  The award began in 1984, when the conference consisted of 10 teams and was known as the Pacific-10.  It stopped being issued starting in 1987 but was restarted in 2018.  The conference added two teams and became the Pac-12 in 2011.

Mike Wurm was the conferences first Sixth Man of the Year with Washington State in 1984.  The conference stopped giving the award after the 1986–87 season but reinstated the award before the 2017–18 season.  The most recent winner of the award is Reese Dixon-Waters, USC.

Winners

Winners by school

References

Sixth Man of the Year
College basketball conference trophies and awards in the United States
Awards established in 1983